Ingalls is an unincorporated community in Menominee County, Michigan, United States. Ingalls has a post office with ZIP code 49848.

History 
Thomas Caldwell first settled Ingalls in 1858. The community was named after Eleazer Stillman Ingalls (1820–1879), a judge who organized Menominee County, in 1863. A station on the Chicago and North Western Railway opened in Ingalls in 1872. A post office opened in Ingalls on June 20, 1879; Louis Dobeas (1847–1933) was the first postmaster.

References

Unincorporated communities in Menominee County, Michigan
Populated places established in 1858
1858 establishments in Michigan
Unincorporated communities in Michigan